Rezonville-Vionville is a commune in the Moselle department in Grand Est in north-eastern France. It was established on 1 January 2019 by merger of the former communes of Rezonville (the seat) and Vionville.

See also
 Communes of the Moselle department

References

External links
 

Communes of Moselle (department)
2019 establishments in France
Populated places established in 2019